Arvopaperi (Finnish: Securities) is a monthly business magazine with a special reference to investment. The monthly is published in Helsinki, Finland, and has been in circulation since 1981.

History and profile
Arvopaperi was founded by the Shareholders Association (Osakesäästäjien Keskusliitto) in 1981. The magazine is published on a monthly basis. Its publisher is Suomen Arvopaperimediat Oy which was acquired by Talentum Media Oy in 2004. Talentum Media Oy also publishes other business-oriented magazines, including Talouselämä and Tekniikka ja Talous. Arvopaperi, based in Helsinki, provides news on financial developments and investment. The magazine focuses on stocks and shares, and has a supplement, Arvoasunto, which is published twice per year.

Eljas Repo was both the editor-in-chief and the shareholder of the monthly. 

In 2011 Arvopaperi had a circulation of 24,944 copies.

See also
List of magazines in Finland

References

External links
 

1981 establishments in Finland
Business magazines published in Finland
Magazines established in 1981
Magazines published in Helsinki
Monthly magazines published in Finland